Char Dham are the four hindu religious sites in Nepal. They are Pashupat Kshetra, Mukti Kshetra, Ruru Kshetra and Baraha Kshetra.

Pashupati Kshetra 

Pashupat Kshetra is situated on the bank of holy Bagmati River in Kathmandu, the capital of Nepal. The Pashupatinath temple is the famous and sacred temple that serves the seat of pashupatinath.
There is harihar kshetra in place of pashupati kshetra.

Mukti Kshetra 

Mukti Kshetra is situated in Mustang district and is sacred to both Hindus and Buddhists.

Ruru Kshetra 

Ruru Kshetra is situated on the bank of Kaligandaki river. Hindus visits here during Maghe Sankranti and take holy bath in Kaligandaki river and worship in Rishikesh Temple believing to obtain moksha.

Baraha Kshetra 

Baraha Kshetra is situated on the confluence of Koka and Koshi river in Sunsari district.

External links
Char Dham of Nepal, Mina nath paudel

References

Hindu temples in Nepal
Hinduism-related lists 
Hinduism in Nepal
Hindu pilgrimage sites in Nepal
Char Dham temples in Nepal